Blue Sky Gallery, also known as The Oregon Center for the Photographic Arts, is a non-profit exhibition space for contemporary photography in Portland, Oregon. Blue Sky Gallery is dedicated to public education, began by showing local artists and then slowly expanded to national and international artists.

History

In 1975 a group of five young photographers—Robert Di Franco, Craig Hickman, Ann Hughes, Terry Toedtemeier, and Christopher Rauschenberg (son of Robert Rauschenberg)—pooled their resources to start a small gallery on NW Lovejoy Street in Portland Oregon. The gallery relocated several times over the years, to NW Fifth Avenue in 1978, then to NW Hoyt Street in 1987, where it remained for just under twenty years. In 2007 Blue Sky raised $2.7 million and moved into the former North Park Blocks store and warehouse of Daisy Kingdom, In July 2008 they exhibited the last completed works by Robert Rauschenberg.

It "has introduced more than 700 emerging and established photographers to the region".

Notes

References

Further reading

External links

 

1975 establishments in Oregon
Art galleries established in 1975
Non-profit organizations based in Oregon
Buildings and structures in Portland, Oregon
Pearl District, Portland, Oregon
Art museums and galleries in Oregon
Photography museums and galleries in the United States
Museums in Portland, Oregon